A butcher block or butcher's block is a heavy duty chopping block, typically laminated of hardwood. 

Traditionally made of hard maple, it was commonly used in butcher shops and meat processing plants but has now become popular in home use.

The term “butcher block” can also refer to the pattern or style of a traditional block adapted to other functions, such as table tops and cutting boards.

There are two basic styles of butcher block: end grain and edge grain. Besides maple, popular contemporary woods include teak, birch, or walnut, sometimes in alternating patterns.

A simple variant of the function of a chopping block is made out of a several-inch-thick cross section of a wide hardwood log.

Use
Butcher blocks have been used in butcher shops for centuries, and still are in many European countries.  Increasingly, a version of butcher block is also being used in domestic kitchens as an alternative to stone and laminate countertops.  This has created a new industry in the kitchen design arena and many furniture manufacturers and hardwood flooring companies are getting into the production of butcher blocks and butcher block countertops, in part because the countertops can be constructed from left-over wood that would otherwise be discarded.

Basic care 
Proper care of a butcher block is important for longevity of the material and, to a degree, food safety.

If the material is regularly exposed to water and not well cleaned mold can form.  The seams where the wood is joined can buckle as the wood expands and contracts.  Keeping the material well oiled allows it to maintain a rich color and its water repelling properties.  

To properly care for the butcher block any foreign material should first be removed, it can be disinfected with vinegar (or in extreme cases, bleach), allowed to dry well, and refreshed with mineral oil or other food safe sealant.

References

External links
Butcher block care (PDF)

Food preparation utensils
Meat industry
Kitchen countertops